Hustad is a village in Hustadvika Municipality in Møre og Romsdal county, Norway. It lies along the Hustadvika coastal area.

Hustad is a thriving village with food stores, a bank, parking facilities, and several other businesses. Hustad has the Stemshest mountains to the east and there are five lakes nearby that are well-stocked with trout. There are also numerous hiking paths such as the famous Atlantic Ocean Road which is located just  to the northeast. Hustad Church is located in the village.

References

Hustadvika (municipality)
Villages in Møre og Romsdal